The Ekaterinoslav Viceroyalty of the Russian Empire was created on 26 March 1783 by merging the Novorossiya Governorate and Azov Governorate. On 31 December 1796, it was incorporated into the re-established Novorossiya Governorate.

Viceroyalty governors

Governor-General (Viceroy) 
 1783 — 05.10.1791 — Grigoriy Potemkin
 1793—1796 — Platon Zubov

Viceroyalty governors 
 1783—1784 — Timofei Tutomlin
 1784—1788 — Ivan Sinelnikov
 1789—1794 — Vasiliy Kakhovskiy
 1794—15.12.1796 — Joseph Horvat

See also 
 Yekaterinoslav Governorate

Viceroyalties of the Russian Empire
1783 establishments in the Russian Empire